Centromere/kinetochore protein zw10 homolog is a protein that in humans is encoded by the ZW10 gene. This gene encodes a protein that is one of many involved in mechanisms to ensure proper chromosome segregation during cell division. The encoded protein binds to centromeres during the prophase, metaphase, and early anaphase cell division stages and to kinetochore microtubules during metaphase.

Function

Zeste white 10 (ZW10) was initially identified as a mitotic checkpoint protein involved in chromosome segregation, and then implicated in targeting cytoplasmic dynein and dynactin to mitotic kinetochores, but it is also important in non-dividing cells. These include cytoplasmic dynein targeting to Golgi and other membranes, and SNARE-mediated ER-Golgi trafficking. Dominant-negative ZW10, anti-ZW10 antibody, and ZW10 RNA interference (RNAi) cause Golgi dispersal. ZW10 RNAi also disperse endosomes and lysosomes.

Drosophila kinetochore components Rough deal (Rod) and Zw10 are required for the proper functioning of the metaphase checkpoint in flies. The eukaryotic spindle assembly checkpoint (SAC) monitors microtubule attachment to kinetochores and prevents anaphase onset until all kinetochores are aligned on the metaphase plate. It is an essential surveillance mechanism that ensures high fidelity chromosome segregation during mitosis. In higher eukaryotes, cytoplasmic dynein is involved in silencing the SAC by removing the checkpoint proteins Mad2 and the Rod-Zw10-Zwilch complex (RZZ) from aligned kinetochores.

Interactions
ZW10 has been shown to interact with RINT1

References

Further reading